Paruparo mio is a butterfly of the family Lycaenidae first described by Hisakazu Hayashi, Heinz G. Schroeder and Colin G. Treadaway in 1984. It is endemic to the Philippine island of Mindanao. Forewing length: 16–17 mm. It is a quite rare species and the threat category is "vulnerable".

References

 , 1984: New lycaenid butterflies from the Philippines (Insecta: Lepidoptera: Lycaenidae). Senckenbergiana Biologica 65 (1/2): 29–41.
 , 1995: Checklisit of the butterflies of the Philippine Islands (Lepidoptera: Rhopalocera). Nachrichten des Entomologischen Vereins Apollo, Suppl. 14: 7–118.

 , 2012: Revised checklist of the butterflies of the Philippine Islands (Lepidoptera: Rhopalocera). Nachrichten des Entomologischen Vereins Apollo, Suppl. 20: 1-64.

Butterflies described in 1984
Paruparo